In the December 2020 issue of American Vogue, English singer Harry Styles wore a custom-made blue Gucci dress as their first ever solo male cover star. Designed by head of Gucci Alessandro Michele, the dress received reactions from both conservative and progressive critics. Conservatives condemned the perceived corruption of traditional masculinity. Progressive critics gave mixed reactions, and the dress generated a significant amount of conversation about sexuality, gender roles, race, and privilege.

Background 
Harry Styles publicly expressed an interest in fashion as early as 2012, when he was still a member of the boy band One Direction. That year he attended his first Burberry show in the front row at London Fashion Week. He wore patterned shirts frequently, and was praised for his enjoyment of leopard and heart prints from Burberry. In 2013, he won the British Style Award at the British Fashion Awards. In 2014, Styles started to wear Yves Saint-Laurent regularly. During this period of time, Styles met his current stylist Harry Lambert. and Gucci's Alessandro Michele.

After his collaboration with Harry Lambert began, Styles' wardrobe was expanded to feature Gucci, as well as small designers such as Daniel W. Fletcher. The floral Gucci suits he wore on the red carpet in 2015 received mixed reactions, with some critics (and the internet generally) comparing him unfavorably to an IKEA couch. In 2016, he did his first solo editorial shoot with Another Man magazine. Prior to his appearance on the cover of Vogue, Styles had modeled for Rolling Stone (twice), The Face, L'Officiel Hommes, Beauty Papers, The Guardian, and many other publications. He had also been the face of three Gucci tailoring campaigns and of Gucci's gender neutral fragrance, Memoire d'un Odeur.

In May 2019, Styles co-chaired the Met Gala alongside Lady Gaga, Serena Williams, Alessandro Michele, and Anna Wintour. 
The cover of Styles' second album, Fine Line, featured Tim Walker fisheye photography of Styles wearing a hot pink button down with pink suspenders and high waisted white pants. When asked by The Guardian in December 2019 if he was dressing this way because he was a "straight dude, sprinkling LGBTQ crumbs that lead nowhere," Styles replied that he was not trying to "sprinkle in nuggets of sexual ambiguity to be more interesting," and that he simply wore things because he thought they looked cool. Styles said he felt that it was a very exciting time to be an artist because a lot of lines were blurring, including the gender binaries of fashion. Over the course of the following year, Styles would continue to wear androgynous, and sometimes daring items of clothing. Notable items included fishnets in the art magazine Beauty Papers, a black dress with white ruffled sleeves in The Guardian, a tutu on Saturday Night Live, and Mary Janes at The Brit Awards.

Design and photography 

The dress is a ruffled periwinkle gown covered in black Valenciennes lace and ribbons. It was constructed by Gucci's Alessandro Michele. Critics have noted it bears similarity to other gowns in the Gucci Fall 2020 collection. It is most similar in appearance to look 15, which is pink. Hamish Bowles, writing for Vogue, described it as a dress, "that Tissot might have liked to paint—acres of ice-blue ruffles, black Valenciennes lace, and suivez-moi, jeune homme [come here, young man] ribbons." The dress was paired with a black double-breasted tuxedo jacket.

The creative vision of the shoot was rooted in androgyny, with Lionel Wendt's homoerotic portraits of Sri Lankan men and Irving Penn's 1950s photographs of midcentury supermodels in Dior and Balenciaga both serving as inspiration. It was photographed by Tyler Mitchell and co-styled by Vogue fashion editor Camilla Nickerson and Harry Lambert. Other items of clothing featured in the shoot included a custom Harris Reed dress-and-trousers combination, custom painted Bode pants, a Comme des Garçons kilt, a Gucci pussy-bow blouse, a Wales Bonner skirt, and a Maison Margiela trench coat.

Reception 
Eliza Huber from Refinery29 praised the shoot, highlighting the fact that the dress was a natural progression of his tendency to buck gender norms in fashion. She noted that while he was not the first male celebrity to wear a dress, "he is one of the first to do so on such a global scale." Orla Pentelow from Bustle concurred, saying, "It is an utter joy. From kilts to Gucci gowns, Styles epitomises a new generation of ahem, style, devoid of any traces of toxic masculinity, and, of course, nails each and every one of the looks."
Reacting to the frenzy caused by the dress, The Daily Telegraph noted that artists such as David Bowie and Iggy Pop "have been strutting their stuff in dresses for decades."

On November 14, conservative commentator Candace Owens tweeted that "There is no society that can survive without strong men. The East knows this. In the west, the steady feminization of our men at the same time that Marxism is being taught to our children is not a coincidence. It is an outright attack. Bring back manly men." Styles responded one month later by posting a photograph of himself in a frilly outfit while suggestively eating a banana, partnered with the caption "Bring back manly men", referencing Owens's tweet.

Podcaster and editor of the Daily Wire, Ben Shapiro, said it was "a referendum on masculinity for men to wear floofy dresses." Senator Ted Cruz of Texas compared him to a painting Jeffrey Epstein had on his wall of former president of the United States Bill Clinton wearing a dress. The son of former president Donald Trump, Donald Trump Jr., also compared him to this painting. Piers Morgan on Good Morning Britain called the dress "a bit weird" and asked "why do men need to wear dresses?" Many progressive public figures leapt to defend Styles, including filmmaker and actress Olivia Wilde, representative Alexandria Ocasio-Cortez of New York, actress Jameela Jamil, and actor Elijah Wood. Raven Smith, writing for Vogue, said that, "a man in a dress seems quite far down the pecking order in terms of stuff to get riled up about." EJ Dickson writing for Rolling Stone said that the point of the shoot was not to be provocative, but simply "to show a gorgeous person in a gorgeous dress, looking gorgeous." Dickson went on to say, "What really incensed conservative commenters like Owens and Shapiro was precisely how mundane the image was supposed to be." Criticism from the right wing has persisted until this day, with Styles featuring as a target of ridicule on Fox News several times since the controversy.

Black gay actor Billy Porter and non-binary Desi performance artist Alok Vaid-Menon expressed mixed and negative feelings about the cover. Vaid-Menon said that they were, "happy to see Harry be celebrated for openly flouting gendered fashion norms," and that they felt it meant that it was "a sign of progress of society’s evolution away from binary gender." However they also felt that "white men should [not] be upheld as the face of gender neutral fashion" because "trans femmes of color started this and continue to face the backlash from it." One year later, while promoting his new book, Unprotected: A Memoir, Porter offered a more scathing critique of Styles' dress. According to Porter, "He doesn't care, he's just doing it because it's the thing to do. This is politics for me. This is my life. I had to fight my entire life to get to the place where I could wear a dress to the Oscars ... All he has to do is be white and straight." He later apologized for centering Harry in the conversation.

Legacy 

In 2020 Styles was voted GQ's "Most Stylish Man of the Year".  Following the controversy, his stylist, Harry Lambert, received a lot of press attention for being the man who "put Harry Styles in a dress." In June 2021 Sunday Times called him "the A-list's secret style weapon".

Nashville-based singer Charlotte Sands wrote a song called "Dress", inspired by Styles' photoshoot. The song went viral on TikTok and has been added to over 37,000 Spotify playlists.
 
In March 2022, Styles' dress was featured at the Victoria and Albert Museum as part of their 'Fashioning Masculinities: The Art of Menswear' exhibition. It was displayed next to a wedding dress worn by drag queen Bimini Bon-Boulash on the second series of RuPaul's Drag Race UK and the black Christian Siriano gown of Billy Porter .

See also 

 Black Christian Siriano gown of Billy Porter
 Queer fashion
 List of individual dresses
 The Man Who Sold the World
 Michael Fish (fashion designer)

References 

2020 in fashion
Blue dresses
Harry Styles
Clothing controversies
Individual dresses
2020s controversies in the United States
Gucci
Vogue (magazine)
Cross-dressing